WRRS may refer to:

 WRRS (FM), a radio station (88.5 FM) licensed to serve Middleborough Center, Massachusetts, United States
 WRRS-LP, a low-power radio station (104.3 FM) licensed to serve Pittsfield, Massachusetts
 WXJC-FM, a radio station (101.1 FM) licensed to serve Cullman, Alabama, United States, which used the call sign WRRS from November 1998 to July 2002
 The ICAO code for Sumbawa Besar Airport in Sumbawa, West Nusa Tenggara, Indonesia
 Western Railroad Supply Company, a former U.S grade crossing signal manufacturer.